Kannauj is a Lok Sabha parliamentary constituency in Uttar Pradesh.

Assembly segments

Members of Parliament

^ by poll

Election results

General election 2019

General election 2014

Bye Election 2012

Dimple Yadav from Samajwadi Party elected unopposed in 2012 bypoll.

General election 2009

General election 2004

Bye Election 2000

General election 1999

General election 1996

See also
 Kannauj
 List of Constituencies of the Lok Sabha

External links
 1971 to 2014 Kannauj Lok Sabha Election Results in Detail

References
 http://www.indiapress.org/election/archives/lok11/biodata/11up50.php

Lok Sabha constituencies in Uttar Pradesh
Kannauj district